William Cadogan may refer to:

 William Cadogan (politician) (1601–1661)
 William Cadogan, 1st Earl Cadogan (1675–1726)
 William Cadogan (childcare) (1711–1797), British physician and childcare writer
 William George Sydney Cadogan (1879–1914), British Army officer
 William Cadogan, 7th Earl Cadogan (1914–1997)